Frednes Bridge (Frednesbrua) is a bridge on Highway 354 in the Porsgrunn municipality of Vestfold og Telemark county, Norway.  

It crosses the Porrsgrunn River (Porsgrunnselva) at the mouth where the Skien River (Skiensvassdraget) passes out into Frierfjord at the site of Norsk Hydro's factory complex.   The bridge was completed in 1995. It is constructed of prestressed concrete with a drawbridge span over the main channel. It is 461  meters long, with a main span of 60  meters and clearance for vessels of 13 meters at mean water level.

Frednes was the historic name of an old district of Porsgrunn as well as the name of the Frednes farm. Frednes was purchased by shipping magnate Christen Knudsen who moved there with his family in 1855. The manor house was expanded in 1865, but burned down in 1952 and was not rebuilt.

See also
List of bridges in Norway
List of bridges in Norway by length

References

Bridges in Vestfold og Telemark
Buildings and structures in Porsgrunn
1995 establishments in Norway